Fisker is a Scandinavian surname meaning fisher (fisherman), in Danish and Norwegian. Its English cognate is the surname Fisher.

People
Persons with the surname Fisker include:

 Henrik Fisker (born 1963), automobile designer and executive chairman of Fisker Automotive
 Henrik Fisker (admiral) (1720-1797), Danish admiral
 Kasper Fisker (born 1988), Danish soccer player
 Kay Fisker (1893-1965), Danish architect
 Knud Erik Fisker (born 1960), Danish soccer referee
 Lorentz Fisker (1753–1819), Danish military officer and oceanographer/geographer
  (1684-1757), amtsforvalter county officer for Nysted and byfoged county officer for København
  (1731-1779), lagmann county officer for Christiansand og Agdesidens
 Maria Fisker (born 1990), Danish handball player
 Peder Andersen Fisker, builder of the Danish motorcycle Nimbus in a partnership with H M Nielsen
 Sisse Fisker (born 1976), Danish television presenter

Similar cognates in other languages
 Czech: Fišer (surname)
 English: Fisher (surname)
 German: Fischer (surname)
 Polish: Fiszer (surname)

References

See also
 Fischer (disambiguation)